{{DISPLAYTITLE:C16H10O5}}
The molecular formula C16H10O5 (molar mass: 282.24 g/mol, exact mass: 282.052823 u) may refer to:

 Damnacanthal, an anthraquinone
 Pseudobaptigenin, an isoflavone

Molecular formulas